Sheffield City School District is a school district in Colbert County, Alabama.

Schools
Sheffield High School
Sheffield Junior High School
L.E. Willson Elementary School
W.A. Threadgill Primary School

External links
 

Education in Colbert County, Alabama